Florent is a French version of the Latin personal name Florentius. It is also used as a surname.

People with the first name
Florent Avdyli (born 1993), Kosovan footballer
Florent Aziri (born 1988), Kosovan-German footballer 
Florent Hadergjonaj (born 1994), Kosovan footballer
Florent Hasani (born 1997), Kosovan footballer
Florent Hoti (born 2000), Kosovan-British footballer
Florent Lambrechts (1910–1990), Belgian footballer
Florent Malouda (born 1980), French footballer and coach 
Florent Muslija (born 1998), Kosovan footballer
Florent Schmitt (1870–1958), French composer

People with the surname
Andrew Florent (1970–2016), Australian tennis player
Oliver Florent, Australian footballer
Hélène Florent, Canadian actress
Guillaume Florent, French sailor and Olympic athlete

Places
Florent (restaurant), former diner in Manhattan, United States

See also
  Includes people with the given name

Saint-Florent (disambiguation)

Surnames of French origin
Albanian masculine given names